Of Malice and the Magnum Heart is the debut full-length album by American-Canadian metalcore band Misery Signals. It was released through Ferret Records on June 1, 2004. The album was produced by Devin Townsend of Strapping Young Lad.

This is the band's last album with original vocalist Jesse Zaraska until 2020's Ultraviolet.

Background
Misery Signals was formed in 2002 by Jesse Zaraska (vocals), Ryan Morgan (lead guitar, backing vocals), Jeff Aust (rhythm guitar), Kyle Johnson (bass guitar), and Branden Morgan (drums) after the dissolution of the bands 7 Angels 7 Plagues, Compromise, and Hamartia. Aust would leave the band shortly after its formation and was replaced by Stu Ross. The band recorded a six song self-titled EP that was released in 2003 through State of the Art Recordings. The EP featured the original version of the song "The Year Summer Ended in June" and was re-recorded for Of Malice and the Magnum Heart; the EP and song are dedicated to the memory of Jordan Wodehouse and Daniel Langlois, who were killed by a drunk driver on Interstate 20 near Heflin, Alabama while on tour with their band Compromise in support of 7 Angels 7 Plagues. 

Matthew Mixon, formerly of 7 Angels 7 Plagues, provides additional vocals on the songs "The Stinging Rain," "Murder," and "Five Years."

Reception and legacy

Of Malice and the Magnum Heart has received critical acclaim since its release.

Elliot of Punknews gave the album a 4.5/5, praising Jesse Zaraska's vocals and lyrics for being emotional and poetic, especially on "The Year Summer Ended in June." The review also praised the band's use of complex time signatures, the guitar work of Ryan Morgan and Stu Ross, and the album's experimentation, highlighting the instrumental "Worlds & Dreams." Graham Landers of Lambgoat also praised the album, highlighting Townsend's production as well as the band's "amalgamation of melodic metal and hardcore." Landers did criticize the use of spoken word vocals, saying "the spoken elements on this record seem strangely forced and out-of-place more times then not (even more so than their debut EP)."

A slightly less positive review came from Jill Mikkelson of Exclaim!. Mikkelson said the album's more melodic parts sounded similar to Hopesfall at times and that "many of the talking parts seem out of place and are often  awkward poetry." However, Mikkelson also stated the album is "a fairly solid record with knowledgeable songwriting and amazing production."

In 2018, New Fury Media called the album a "modern-day classic," citing Devin Townsend's production for having a "clear, yet raw and slightly unpolished feeling," Zaraska's passionate vocals, and the song "The Year Summer Ended in June" for being "emotionally devastating." The album was included in Brooklyn Vegan's 2021 list of "15 Seminal Albums from Metalcore's Second Wave (2000-2010)."

To celebrate the album's 10th anniversary, the band's original line–up reunited for the Malice X tour in August 2014.

Track listing

Personnel
Credits adapted from AllMusic:
Misery Signals
 Jesse Zaraska – lead vocals
 Ryan Morgan – lead guitar, backing vocals
 Stuart Ross – rhythm guitar, backing vocals
 Kyle Johnson – bass
 Branden Morgan – drums

Additional personnel
 Devin Townsend – producer, additional vocals on "A Victim, A Target"
 Shawn Thingvold – engineer, mastering, mixing
 Greg Reely – mastering
 Scott Cooke – engineer
 Matthew Mixon – additional vocals on "The Stinging Rain", "Murder" and "Five Years"
 Byron Jay Ellis – clean vocals on "Difference of Vengeance and Wrongs"
 Tom Bejgrowicz – art direction, concept, design, layout design
 Travis Smith – illustrations

References

2004 debut albums
Misery Signals albums
Ferret Music albums
Albums produced by Devin Townsend
Albums with cover art by Travis Smith (artist)